The Prêmio Machado de Assis (the Machado de Assis Prize) is a literary prize awarded by the Brazilian Academy of Letters, and possibly the most prestigious literary award in Brazil. The prize was founded in 1941, named in memory of the novelist Joaquim Maria Machado de Assis (1839–1908). It is awarded in recognition of a lifetime's work.

Winners

 2021 - Ruy Castro
 2017 - João José Reis
 2016 - Ignácio de Loyola Brandão
 2015 - Rubem Fonseca
 2014 - Vamireh Chacon
 2013 - Silviano Santiago
 2012 - Dalton Trevisan
 2011 - Carlos Guilherme Mota
 2010 - Benedito Nunes
 2009 - Salim Miguel
 2008 - Autran Dourado
 2007 - Roberto Cavalcanti de Albuquerque
 2006 - César Leal
 2005 - Ferreira Gullar
 2004 - Francisco de Assis Brasil
 2003 - Antonio Carlos Villaça
 2002 - Wilson Martins
 2001 – Ana Maria Machado
 2000 – Antônio Torres
 1999 – Fernando Sabino
 1998 – Joel Silveira
 1997 – J.J. Veiga
 1996 – Carlos Heitor Cony
 1995 – Leodegário A. de Azevedo Filho
 1994 – Antônio Olinto
 1993 – Antonio Candido
 1992 – Fausto Cunha
 1991 – Maria Clara Machado
 1990 – Sábato Magaldi
 1989 – Gilberto Mendonça Teles
 1988 – Dante Milano
 1987 – Nilo Pereira
 1986 – Péricles Eugênio da Silva Ramos
 1985 – Thales de Azevedo
 1984 – Henriqueta Lisboa
 1983 – Paulo Rónai
 1982 – Franklin de Oliveira
 1981 – Ayres da Matta Machado Filho
 1980 – Mário Quintana
 1979 – Gilka Machado
 1978 – Carolina Nabuco
 1977 – Raul Bopp
 1976 – Mario da Silva Brito
 1975 – Hermes Lima
 1974 – Waldemar Cavalcanti
 1973 – Andrade Murici
 1972 – Dalcídio Jurandir
 1971 – Murillo Araujo
 1970 – Otávio de Faria
 1969 – Edilson Carneiro
 1968 – Oscar Mendes
 1967 – Adelino Magalhães
 1966 – Lúcio Cardoso
 1965 – Cecília Meireles
 1964 – Joracy Camargo
 1963 – Gilberto Freyre
 1962 – Antenor Nascentes
 1961 – João Guimarães Rosa
 1960 – not awarded
 1959 – José Maria Belo
 1958 – Rachel de Queiroz
 1957 – Tasso da Silveira
 1956 – Luiz da Câmara Cascudo
 1955 – Onestaldo Penafort
 1954 – Dinah Silveira de Queiroz
 1953 – Érico Veríssimo
 1952 – Antonio da Silva Melo
 1951 – Padre Augusto Magne
 1950 – Eugênio Gomes
 1949 – not awarded
 1948 – Augusto Meyer
 1947 – not awarded
 1946 – Tobias Monteiro
 1945 – Osório Dutra
 1944 – not awarded
 1943 – Sousa da Silveira
 1942 – Afonso Schmidt
 1941 – Tetra de Teffé

References

Brazilian literary awards
Awards established in 1941
1941 establishments in Brazil
Portuguese-language literary awards